Khara Rud (also Romanized as Kharā Rūd and Khara Rood; also known as  Pā’īn Kharārūd, Pā’īn Kharā Rūd, and Salash-e Kharārūd) is a village in Khara Rud Rural District, in the Central District of Siahkal County, Gilan Province, Iran. At the 2006 census, its population was 861, in 223 families.

References 

Populated places in Siahkal County